Raveena Aurora (born September 30, 1993), mononymously known as Raveena, is an American singer-songwriter. She gained a following after her first debut EP, Shanti, was released independently in 2017. Her first album, Lucid, was released independently in 2019 and distributed through Empire Distribution which rose to critical acclaim. In 2020, she released her second EP, Moonstone. After signing to Warner Records, she released her second album, Asha's Awakening, on February 11, 2022 and was met with positive reviews from critics.

Early life
Raveena Aurora was born on September 30, 1993 in Massachusetts to Indian Punjabi immigrants and grew up in both Queens, Stamford, Connecticut and moved and grew up in New York when she was 17 and she would visit India regularly. Aurora is Indian Punjabi American; her family immigrated to Queens from Punjab, India, after the 1984 anti-Sikh riots in which her maternal uncle was killed, and her family's business was burned down. She was raised in a traditional Sikh household. As a child, she started writing poetry. She became exposed to R&B, Soul, Jazz and Folk music in middle school, which piqued her interest in music and influenced her musical style later in life.

At the age of 11, she started singing and would sing in the bathroom for hours a day, also studying on how to use her voice and use it as an instrument. Her first performance was at sixth grade in a talent show where she performed "Colors of the Wind" from Pocahontas.  Soon her passion eventually became a decision to pursue music professionally. She said, "I was pretty set on it, honestly. Since I was really young, I knew that there weren’t any other options for me." Although her parents were initially "very hesitant" that she wanted to purse a music career, they were always supportive of her developing her skills in music. She has stated that her father was interested in Indian Instruments such the harmonium and tabla and kept that in their house. At the age of 12, she wrote her first song and at age of 13, Aurora began songwriting and consequently started experimenting music with different genres. She studied at New York University Tisch School of the Arts.

Career

2012-2019: Career beginnings, Shanti and Lucid
Aurora mentioned that she would always audition for Broadway musicals but she said that "there were no roles for little Indian girls". She also mentioned that people told her many times that she can't be expected to sign a record deal if she was an Indian woman and them saying that "It's not gonna work", but she said that "It never became about signing a deal at that point. I was just like, 'I don't need to rely on these things, it's gonna work if it's meant to happen.'" She would also sing for church services. When she was 18, Aurora independently released her first single and music video, "Grey Eyes" on December 4, 2012 in YouTube. Along with her old EP, Where We Wander which was released independently on February 19, 2013 but she later made them private.

During her beginning of her career, she was denied by multiple record labels. She said, "I would have label meetings and people would be like 'we can't sign you, you’re brown', to my face they would tell me 'there's no space for you.' I was forced to build the infrastructure myself. I hope that the people who have control over that infrastructure start to support marginalized artists really early on. It's such a hard phase when you're in it, and it breaks a lot of people."

She worked many full-time jobs, like nannying or even had worked at her first job in American Apparel as a sales associate and saved to spend her money to self-fund her music projects. When she was 21, she met and started working with record producer Everett Orr in 2015. She and Orr continued releasing singles "You Give Me That", "Johnny It's the Last Time" and "Something's Gotta Give" on SoundCloud in 2016. She amassed a sizable online following after the release of her first EP, Shanti in December 2017. Shanti explored themes of self-love and healing, and blended R&B, soul, and jazz music. Her debut EP drew praise from Sidney Madden of NPR for her "cool delivery and chill-inducing falsetto runs" and "astute songwriting chops". She directed several of her own music videos where she displayed her Indian heritage and "rich interiority of women of color like herself". The third track of the EP, "No Better" is included as a soundtrack for the 2020 romantic drama film, All My Life. She also released a bonus track for the EP, "Wherever U Go" in January 12, 2018.

Aurora performed her 2018 single "If Only" on the global music platform, COLORS, in January 2018 in which her popularity rapidly increased. On June 6, 2018, Aurora announced in social media her first headling tour, Woman is Holy Tour, a reference to her own lyric from the 2018 single "If Only".

In the summer of 2018, she was included in ModCloth's Say It Louder campaign, which aimed to celebrate individuality and strong female icons in music. She was featured alongside other outspoken female musicians like Lizzo, Awkwafina and Hayley Kiyoko. In November 2018, she performed at Tyler, The Creator's Camp Flog Gnaw Carnival.

In March 2019, Aurora co-headlined the Java Jazz Festival in Jakarta, Indonesia, with H.E.R and Toto.

On May 31, 2019, she released her debut album Lucid, distributed through Empire Distribution. Lyrically, she explored sensuality, healing from trauma, and spirituality; through tracks like "Stronger" and "Salt Water", she opened up about her experience as a sexual assault and abuse survivor between the age of 17 and 22. Lucid was met with very positive reviews. Sidney Madden of NPR described Lucid as "comforting but nuanced, balancing cultures old and new by mashing up contemporary R&B with traditions from the South Asian diaspora". In a track review for the penultimate track, "Petal", Vrinda Jagota from Pitchfork wrote: "over the course of 12 songs, her sound becomes bolder and clearer, finding strength in everything from sun showers to her mother’s resilience to her own femininity and womanhood". To support her album, Aurora announced in social media that she embarked on her second headlined tour, Lucid Tour, in June 14, 2019. "Lucid" was named one of the "Best Albums of 2019" by NPR. Aurora's 2019 single "Stronger" was named one of the "100 Best Songs of 2019" by Noisey.

2020-present: Moonstone and Asha's Awakening
On February 7, 2020, Aurora released her second four-track EP, Moonstone through Empire Distribution and Moonstone Recordings LLC, her own label. It was released after a week of her single, "Headaches". The EP blends psychedelic indie pop with soul. Moonstone explored her past relationships and her own identity.

In February 5, 2021, Aurora released a new single and music video, "Tweety".

In 2022, she signed to Warner Records and she announced her sophomore album, Asha's Awakening, in January 2022. The record was created as a concept album from the perspective of a Punjabi space princess. The release was preceded by the singles "Rush" and "Secret," with the latter featuring American rapper Vince Staples. Asha's Awakening was released on February 11, 2022 and received acclaim from music critics. Eric Torres from Pitchfork said that it is "a throat-clearing moment for the singer, drawing on both Western and South Asian inspirations and collaborations for a blend of dance-friendly R&B songs and soothing ballads, each of which stands on her distinctive, quiet strength." In the track, "Time Flies", she opened her experience on having an abortion at age 21. Asha's Awakening was included as the "Best Albums of 2022 So Far" by Rolling Stone and also by Clash and NPR. "Rush" was included as "The Best Songs of 2022 So Far" by Rolling Stone. On December 1, 2022, Asha's Awakening was included in Rolling Stone'''s "The 100 Best Albums of 2022" and ranked in 84.

To promote Asha's Awakening, Aurora embarked on an Asha's Awakening national tour that lasted from 15 April 2022 to May 28, 2022. She headlined of the 2022 Coachella Music Festival. She became the first woman of Indian descent to perform as a solo artist at Coachella Music Festival.

On November 5, 2022, she announced that she embarked a Latin America Tour where she performed at Primavera in Brazil, Buenos Aires and Chile. She also performed at Corona Capital in Mexico City, and she made her India debut and performed at Lollapalooza India in Mumbai, India, in January 29, 2023.

Artistry
Influences
Aurora cites Asha Puthli as one of her greatest inspiration and influence. She grew up listening to Bollywood soundtracks. When she was 8 years old, she was first introduced to the music of singers Ella Fitzgerald and Billie Holiday. Her other influences that she drew heavy inspirations are Nina Simone, Minnie Riperton, Corinne Bailey Rae, Sade, rock band Fleetwood Mac, Stevie Wonder, D'Angelo. and Björk. She also grew up listening to Indian musicians Asha Bhosle, Lata Mangeshkar and Ravi Shankar. When writing for Lucid, Feist, Sade, Kadhja Bonet, Asha Puthli and Björk were her influences for her album. She cited the British-Sri Lankan rapper M.I.A. as an influence as during her teenage years, she only had M.I.A. that represent "some version of herself". She focused and watched her go to mainstream music, M.I.A. showed and proven Aurora that it was possible for her to go to mainstream as well. Speaking to NME, she said that "When I saw someone like M.I.A. go mainstream, I thought this is a path I could potentially take." When she started listening to Billie Holiday and Ella Fitzgerald, they inspired her to be a singer, saying, "Once I heard their voices, I was hooked, there was no turning back. I really fell in love with the voice and how to use it and study it and be as expressive with it as possible."

Musical style and songwriting
Aurora has been described as a R&B, soul, jazz, experimental, contemporary R&B and pop singer. The subject of her songs are based on her personal experiences. Her lyrics refer to variety of themes, such as identity politics, sexuality, heartbreaks, hardships, and mental struggles. She stated that she had always found songwriting to be a form of catharsis and having music as a way to process and reflect on her experiences "saved" her. Before making Shanti'', she said, "I wrote hundreds and hundreds and hundreds of songs before my first project. Good songwriting is the heart of any person’s success, so I felt like the only thing I could do is write good songs to prove myself."

Personal life
She is openly bisexual. She is spiritual as she regularly reads Buddhist, Sikh and Hindu texts. She also focuses on meditation and mindfulness.

Discography

Studio Albums

Extended Plays

Singles

Tours
 Woman Is Holy Tour (2018)
 Lucid Tour (2019)
 Asha's Awakening Tour (2022)

References

Notes

External links 
 
 
 
 

1993 births
Living people
American people of Indian descent
American people of Punjabi descent
American Sikhs
American women singers of Indian descent
Bisexual singers
American LGBT singers
American LGBT songwriters
Bisexual songwriters
LGBT people from Massachusetts
American LGBT people of Asian descent
LGBT people from Connecticut
LGBT people from New York (state)
20th-century American LGBT people
21st-century American LGBT people
LGBT Sikhs
21st-century American women
Warner Records artists
American contemporary R&B singers
American women singer-songwriters
Experimental musicians
Jazz musicians
American women songwriters
Singer-songwriters from Massachusetts
American bisexual writers